Abdul Jabbar (born 31 January 1919, date of death unknown) was an Indian cricketer. He played seventeen first-class matches for Bengal between 1937 and 1945. Jabbar is deceased.

See also
 List of Bengal cricketers

References

External links
 

1919 births
Year of death missing
Indian cricketers
Bengal cricketers
Place of birth missing